A mainline flight is a flight operated by an airline's main operating unit, rather than by regional alliances, regional code-shares, regional subsidiaries, or wholly owned subsidiaries offering low-cost operations. Mainline carriers typically operate between hub airports within their network and on international or long-haul services, using narrow-body and wide-body aircraft. This is in contrast to regional airlines, providing feeder services to hub airports operating smaller turboprop or regional jet aircraft, or low-cost carrier subsidiaries serving leisure markets.

In the United States, examples of mainline passenger airline flights include those operated by American Airlines, Delta Air Lines, and United Airlines; but not flights operated by regional airlines Envoy Air, Mesa Airlines, Executive Airlines, Piedmont Airlines, or PSA Airlines with regional jets or the services of regional airline marketing brands such as American Eagle, Delta Connection, or United Express aboard lower-capacity narrowbody jets and turboprop aircraft, such as those produced by Embraer or Bombardier, that do not have transcontinental range.

U.S. legacy carriers may operate branded mainline services using the same flight crews and AOC as that of their mainline operations. For example, United p.s. and American Flagship Service cater to the medium-haul transcontinental business segment. Short-haul air shuttles, such as Delta Shuttle, operate at high frequency intervals between busy city pairs. Previously, U.S. legacy carriers operated low-cost air services within their mainline operations to compete with low-cost carriers; these operations were short-lived and included brands such as Continental Lite, Song (Delta), and Ted (United). Outside the U.S., low-cost carrier subsidiary airlines are more common, with examples including Air Canada Rouge, Jetstar Airways (subsidiary of Qantas), and Eurowings (subsidiary of Lufthansa).

An airline carrier's collective bargaining agreement with flight crews stipulates the maximum seating capacity of regional aircraft; as such, any aircraft that exceeds this capacity must operate as a mainline flight. The converse is not the case; mainline flight crews, with proper type ratings, may operate aircraft that are smaller than typical mainline aircraft.

Mainline subsidiary carriers and airline within an airline brands

Notes:

1Though not part of the main "legacy airline" or "flag carrier", these particular airlines are often described as "regional airlines" by the mainline airline counterparts they are affiliated or owned by.
2These airline businesses resultant of airline liberalization in Europe, really do not have a "mainline brand", but do have unified brandings across multiple individual airline certificates forming "virtual airlines" much like the American Eagle, Delta Connection, and United Express banner branded regional airlines in the United States.

North American mainline carrier's regional affiliates

Notes:
1 Branding used for regional feeder service and commuter flights. Operated either by a regional subsidiary or under contract by an independent regional airline.
2These airlines are independent and not subsidiaries of mainline air carriers.
3 These independent airlines operate regional aircraft under codeshare agreements with a mainline carrier.
4 Independent airlines operating under a capacity purchase agreement with their mainline partner

See also
 Flag carrier

Notes

References

 AA and early references to mainline, regional and B-scale.

 Business model of new Airlines like GLO not operating their own aircraft but leasing them from other certificated air carriers, and creating their own airline brand without the actual assets of a true airline.

Airline types
Civil aviation